Jeong Kwan (born 1957) is a Seon Buddhist nun and chef of Korean cuisine. She lives in the Chunjinam Hermitage at the Baegyangsa temple in South Korea, where she cooks for fellow nuns and monks, as well as occasional visitors. Jeong Kwan does not own a restaurant and has no formal culinary training.
 
The fifth of seven siblings, Jeong Kwan was born in Yeongju in North Gyeongsang Province and grew up on a farm. She learned to make noodles by hand at age 7. She ran away from home at 17, and two years later joined an order of Seon nuns, where she discovered her calling of spreading dharma through cooking. Jeong Kwan's recipes use aubergines, tomatoes, plums, oranges, pumpkin, tofu, basil, chilli pepper, and other vegetables, which she grows herself. In addition to being strictly vegan, Jeong Kwan's recipes omit garlic and onions, which some Buddhists believe increases libido.
 
Jeong Kwan has influenced chefs including Mingoo Kang, of the Seoul restaurant Mingles, and René Redzepi, of Noma in Copenhagen. She is friends with Éric Ripert, a fellow Buddhist, who has invited her to New York City to cook for private audiences at Le Bernadin. In 2017, Jeong Kwan was featured on the Netflix series Chef's Table.

References

Living people
1957 births
20th-century Buddhist nuns
21st-century Buddhist nuns
Chefs of Korean cuisine
Chefs of vegan cuisine
South Korean Buddhist nuns
South Korean chefs
People from Yeongju